The U.S. state of Oregon contains eleven national forests.

See also
 Lists of Oregon-related topics

References

 
National forests